Waseem Rahman (born 8 July 1998) is a South African cricketer. He made his List A debut on 6 October 2019, for KwaZulu-Natal Inland in the 2019–20 CSA Provincial One-Day Challenge. He made his first-class debut on 4 March 2021, for KwaZulu-Natal Inland in the 2020–21 CSA 3-Day Provincial Cup.

References

External links
 

1998 births
Living people
South African cricketers
KwaZulu-Natal cricketers
Place of birth missing (living people)